Waskwiatik Sakahikan 223 is an Indian reserve of the Peter Ballantyne Cree Nation in Saskatchewan. It is on Oskotim Lake.

References

Indian reserves in Saskatchewan
Peter Ballantyne Cree Nation